Scobey is a surname. Notable people with the surname include:

Bob Scobey (1916–1963), American jazz musician
Frank Edgar Scobey (1866–1931), director of the United States Mint
J. O'B. Scobey (1854–1910), American politician 
Josh Scobey (born 1979), American football player
Margaret Scobey (born c. 1949), American diplomat